5648 Axius, provisional designation: , is a Jupiter trojan from the Trojan camp, approximately  in diameter. It was discovered on 11 November 1990, by Japanese amateur astronomers Kin Endate and Kazuro Watanabe at the Kitami Observatory on the northern island of Hokkaidō, Japan. The dark D-type asteroid belongs to the 70 largest Jupiter trojans and has a long rotation period of 37.6 hours. It was named after Axius, a river god from Greek mythology.

Orbit and classification 

Axius is a dark Jovian asteroid in a 1:1 orbital resonance with Jupiter. It is located in the trailering Trojan camp at the Gas Giant's  Lagrangian point, 60° behind its orbit . It is also a non-family asteroid of the Jovian background population.

It orbits the Sun at a distance of 4.3–6.0 AU once every 11 years and 8 months (4,271 days; semi-major axis of 5.15 AU). Its orbit has an eccentricity of 0.17 and an inclination of 23° with respect to the ecliptic. The body's observation arc begins with a precovery taken at the Palomar Observatory in June 1950, more than 40 years prior to its official discovery observation.

Numbering and naming 

This minor planet was numbered on 1 September 1993. On 14 May 2021, the object was named by the Working Group Small Body Nomenclature (WGSBN), after Axius, a river god from Greek mythology, who is the son of Oceanus and Tethys, the father of Pelegon and grandfather of Asteropaios.

Physical characteristics 

In both the Tholen- and SMASS-like taxonomy of the Small Solar System Objects Spectroscopic Survey (S3OS2), Axius is a dark D-type asteroid, the dominant spectral type among the larger Jupiter trojans. It has a typical V–I color index of 0.90.

Rotation period 

In February 2005, Federico Manzini at the Sozzago Astronomical Station  in Italy obtained the first rotational lightcurve of Axius. It gave a tentative rotation period of 16.04 hours with a brightness amplitude of 0.22 based on three nights of observation magnitude.

In June 2006, photometric observations over eight nights were made by Italian astronomer Stefano Mottola at the Calar Alto Observatory in Spain. Lightcurve analysis gave a rotation period of  hours with a brightness amplitude of 0.20 magnitude, superseding Manzini's previous result. A concurring period of 37.6083 hours with an amplitude of 0.19 magnitude was measured by astronomers at the Palomar Transient Factory in October 2013. While not being a slow rotator, its period is significantly longer than that of most larger Jupiter trojans (see list below).

Diameter and albedo 

According to the survey carried out by the NEOWISE mission of NASA's Wide-field Infrared Survey Explorer, Axius measures 59.30 kilometers in diameter and its surface has an albedo 0.073, while the Collaborative Asteroid Lightcurve Link assumes a standard albedo for a carbonaceous asteroid of 0.057 and calculates a diameter of 63.91 kilometers based on an absolute magnitude of 9.7. A diameter measurement for this asteroid has not been previously published by Akari and IRAS.

Notes

References

External links 
 Asteroid Lightcurve Database (LCDB), query form (info )
 Discovery Circumstances: Numbered Minor Planets (5001)-(10000) – Minor Planet Center
 
 

005648
Discoveries by Kin Endate
Discoveries by Kazuro Watanabe
Named minor planets
19901111